Moosa Lane is one of the neighbourhoods of Lyari Town in Karachi, Sindh, Pakistan.

There are several ethnic groups in Moosa Lane including Muhajirs, kutchis Sindhis, Punjabis, Kashmiris, Seraikis, Pakhtuns, Balochis, and Memons, etc.

References

External links 
 Karachi Website.

Neighbourhoods of Karachi